Inversiones y Representaciones Sociedad Anónima (IRSA) is the leading real estate development firm in Argentina. Its controlled by Cresud S.A. (NASDAQ:CRESY) in a 64%.

Overview

IRSA (Investments and Brokerage, Inc.) was founded as a realty by Eduardo Elsztain, an Argentine Jewish immigrant, in 1943. The small independent realty, based in Buenos Aires, grew slowly and, as late as 1991, had a book value of around US$120,000. That year, the firm was purchased by a partnership composed of Marcelo Mindlin and Eduardo Elsztain, the founder's grandson, who had recently obtained support from international financier George Soros.

  
The partnership with Soros became profitable for both parties, as the Argentine economy recovered during the 1990s from the severe stagflation of the previous decade. IRSA entered the international equity markets with Soros' backing in 1994, raising US$110 million, and purchased three Buenos Aires office buildings and a leading local shopping mall developer, Alto Palermo S.A. (APSA), in 1996. The firm's APSA unit later purchased Buenos Aires Design, Galerías Pacífico, Patio Bullrich, Patio Olmos, and a number of other leading Argentine shopping centers, as well as important tourist assets such as the Llao Llao Hotel, a Bariloche mountain resort privatized in 1997. The following year, the firm redeveloped the historic Abasto de Buenos Aires, a landmark Art Deco former wholesale market. The firm, by then, also owned 13 of the most important commercial office buildings in Buenos Aires, enjoying occupancy rates of 97%, and some of the city's highest rents.

IRSA also ventured into the agricultural sector by being purchased by Cresud S.A. in 1994. Cresud became a leading landowner of prime pampas agricultural land, controlling over a million hectares (2.5 million acres), as well as acquiring a significant stake in BrasilAgro.

Losses stemming from the Argentine economic crisis that began in 1998 led to Soros' divesting most of his IRSA interests, and by late 1999, the Soros Fund Management held 7% of the firm's stock. IRSA was forced to retrench somewhat, selling its Venezuelan interests and the historic Galerías Pacífico arcade. The group's losses totaled US$590 million during the 1999–2002 crisis, equal to Soros' total return in the venture during the 1990s.

Responsible for half the group's net sales, its seven remaining shopping centers boosted the firm's income following the strong recovery in the Argentine economy after 2002, however, and in 2008, it developed Dot Baires, a 190,000m² (2 million ft²) shopping center and the largest building of its kind in Argentina.

The company resumed its purchases of office buildings during the recovery. Notable among these was Bouchard Plaza in 2007, which brought the number of such buildings in its portfolio to 17. It also purchased one of three remaining undeveloped lots in the Catalinas Norte office park in 2009.

IRSA continued to expand into the mortgage lending sector, purchasing 28% of the formerly state owned Banco Hipotecario, and into the farming and ranching sectors, acquiring the local subsidiary of Amarillo, Texas-based Cactus Feeders in 2009, as well as into the large Brazilian real estate market, establishing IRSA-Cyrela (a joint venture with Cyrela Brazil Realty).

References

Companies listed on the New York Stock Exchange
Companies listed on the Buenos Aires Stock Exchange
Real estate companies of Argentina
Companies based in Buenos Aires
Real estate companies established in 1943
Argentine companies established in 1943
Multinational companies headquartered in Argentina